The Church of Jesus Christ of Latter-day Saints in Hungary refers to the Church of Jesus Christ of Latter-day Saints (LDS Church) and its members in Hungary.  In 1990, there were 75 members in Hungary.  In December of 2021, there were 5,278 members in 21 congregations.

History

On June 24, 1988, the church received legal recognition from the Hungarian government. On October 17, 1989, the first meetinghouse in Hungary was dedicated. The Book of Mormon was published in Hungarian in 1991. In 2003, a complex housing the mission office and home, a chapel, Church Educational System offices, classrooms, and an activity area was completed and dedicated in Budapest. The Budapest Hungary Stake, Hungary's first, was organized on June 4, 2006.

In 2022, during the Ukrainian refugee crisis, the LDS Church found and funded an organization renting an entire 62-room hotel in Hungary and assisting covering the rental cost at the hotel.. This can house up to three hundred women and children for short-term stays.

Church membership and organization

Stakes and districts

As of February 2023, the following stake and districts were located in Hungary:

Budapest Hungary Stake
Buda Egyházközség (Buda Ward)
Dunaújváros Gyülekezet (Dunaújváros Branch)
Győr Egyházközség (Győr Ward)
Kaposvár Gyülekezet (Kaposvár Branch)
Kecskemét Egyházközség (Kecskemét Ward)
Kispest Egyházközség (Kispest Ward)
Pest Egyházközség (Pest Ward)
Pécs Gyülekezet (Pécs Branch)
Szeged Gyülekezet (Szeged Branch)
Szolnok Gyülekezet (Szolnok Branch)
Székesfehérvár Gyülekezet (Székesfehérvár Branch)
Veszprém Gyülekezet (Veszprém Branch)
Érd Gyülekezet (Érd Branch)

Miskolc Hungary District
Debrecen Gyülekezet (Debrecen Branch)
Eger Gyülekezet (Eger Branch)
Miskolc Gyülekezet (Miskolc Branch)
Nyíregyháza Gyülekezet (Nyíregyháza Branch)

Szombathely Hungary District
Pápa Gyülekezet (Pápa Branch)
Sopron Gyülekezet (Sopron Branch)
Szombathely Gyülekezet (Szombathely Branch)'

Other Congregations

The following congregations are not part of a stake or district:
Békéscsaba Branch
Congregations not within a stake are named branches, regardless of size.

Missions
After the LDS Church gained official recognition in Hungary in 1988, the country became part of the Austria Vienna East Mission. The Hungary Budapest Mission was organized in June 1990. The name has since changed to the Hungary/Romania Mission. 

In November 2022, the church announced it will be dividing the mission in July 2023 with the creation of the Romania Bucharest Mission. The mission in Hungary will be renamed to Hungary Budapest Mission

Temples
The Budapest Hungary Temple was announced on April 7, 2019 by church president Russell M. Nelson.

See also
Religion in Hungary

References

External links
 The Church of Jesus Christ of Latter-day Saints (Hungary) - Official Site
 The Church of Jesus Christ of Latter-day Saints Hungary Newsroom 
 ComeUntoChrist.org Latter-day Saints Visitor site
 The Eastern Edge: LDS Missionary Work in Hungarian Lands - University of Illinois Press
 Being Mormon in Hungary - Central European University
 Mormons in Hungary - Orlando Sentinel